Laroche-Saint-Cydroine is a commune in the Yonne department in Bourgogne-Franche-Comté in north-central France.

Name

The village of Saint-Cydroine in the commune of Laroche-Saint-Cydroine is named after Saint Sidronius.
It is said that Sidronius was martyred here by the Romans, and a spring here with miraculous powers was a place of pilgrimage in the Middle Ages.

Church
The  is an 11th- or 12th-century Romanesque church with an octagonal tower in the village dedicated to the saint.
It was founded by the abbey of La Charité-sur-Loire.

Transportation
The commune is served by trains at Laroche-Migennes station.

See also
Communes of the Yonne department

References

Sources

Communes of Yonne